The figaro chain is a jewellery chain design consisting of two or three small circular links followed by one elongated oval link. The most notable figaro chains are manufactured in Italy. They are usually worn by men and are often adorned with pendants such as crosses and medallions.

The name of the design may have been inspired by the operas The Barber of Seville (by Gioachino Rossini) and The Marriage of Figaro (by Wolfgang Amadeus Mozart).

References

Jewellery components